, known professionally as , is a German-born Japanese actor and rapper. His best-known role is voicing Takeshi Goda in the Doraemon series, which has spawned numerous specials.

Biography
Kimura was born in Blankenburg (Harz) and raised in Japan. After spending seven years in Germany, he returned to the theater company belonging to Sanno Production. In 2002, he appeared as a tap dancer in the Broadway musical Annie. He graduated from Harumi Sogo High School, but dropped out of Asia University.

When he was in elementary school, he appeared as a child who resembled Kenji Haga in the impersonation program Mimakin on Nippon TV.

On 15 April 2005, he became the new voice of Takeshi Goda in TV Asahi's anime series Doraemon, replacing the late Kazuya Tatekabe. Kimura was a junior high school student when he started the role.

Filmography

TV drama
Tanken Bakumon (2012), Narrator
Doubutsu Sentai Zyuohger (2016), Bowlingam (ep. 19–20)
Uchu Sentai Kyuranger (2017), Seiza Blaster Voice, Ragio Voice (ep. 11–12), Dark Blaster (ep. 26, 28, 31)
Mashin Sentai Kiramager (2020), Bomb Jamen (ep. 25-26)
GARUGAKU. ~Girls Garden~ (2021), Subanii
We Are Medical Interns (2021), Takeshi Yamashita (ep. 2, 4, 6–7)
Kamen Rider Revice (2021), Vice / Kamen Rider Vice, Himself (30 - 31)
The 13 Lords of the Shogun (2022), Prince Mochihito
What Will You Do, Ieyasu? (2023), Watanabe Moritsuna

Anime
2005
Doraemon (2005–present), Takeshi Goda

2011
Penguindrum, Kanba Takakura, Penguin 1

2012
Kuroko's Basketball, Papa Mbaye Siki
Code:Breaker, Heike Masaomi

2013
Gundam Build Fighters, Alan Adams

2014
The Kindaichi Case Files R, Daisuke Kujiraki
Psycho-Pass 2, Ogino
Ping Pong: The Animation, Manabu Sakuma
Black Bullet, Takuto Yasuwaki

2015
Assassination Classroom, Ryōma Terasaka
Dance with Devils, Mage Nanashiro

2016
Sekkō Boys, Jiro Sandajima, Agrippa, Dionysos
Bubuki Buranki, Sōya Arabashiri
Assassination Classroom 2nd Season, Ryōma Terasaka
Kagewani -II-, Jōji Honma
91 Days, Strega Galassia
Haikyū!! Karasuno High School vs Shiratorizawa Academy, Satori Tendō
Mobile Suit Gundam: Iron-Blooded Orphans, Dayne Uhai
March Comes in like a Lion, Issa Matsumoto

2017
Yu-Gi-Oh! VRAINS, Shōichi Kusanagi
Puri Puri Chiichan!!, Chiteko (ep. 24)
Altair: A Record of Battles, Kurt
Boruto: Naruto Next Generations, Kū

2018
Zombie Land Saga, Rapper A 
Devilman Crybaby, Gabi
Zoids Wild, Gyoza

2019
JoJo's Bizarre Adventure: Golden Wind, Pesci
RobiHachi, Allo
Midnight Occult Civil Servants, Kiyo Gongen
Actors: Songs Connection, Chiguma Marume
Carole & Tuesday, Ezekiel
Case File nº221: Kabukicho, Masaya

2020
 Hypnosis Mic: Division Rap Battle: Rhyme Anima, Ichiro Yamada
 Jujutsu Kaisen, Aoi Todou
 Ikebukuro West Gate Park, Hiroto
 Akudama Drive, Hoodlum

2021
 2.43: Seiin High School Boys Volleyball Team, Yusuke Okuma
 Beastars Season 2, Free
 Dragon Quest: The Adventure of Dai , Galdandy
 The World Ends with You the Animation, Bito Daisukenojo
 Tokyo Revengers, Haruki Hayashida
 Re-Main, Jō Jōjima
 One Piece, Buggy (young)
 Demon Slayer: Kimetsu no Yaiba, Muscular Mice

2022
 Cap Kakumei Bottleman DX, Tsubasa Akaushi
 The Prince of Tennis II: U-17 World Cup, J. J. Dorgias

Original net animation (ONA)
Monster Strike (2016), Sanjo Takii
Koro-sensei Q! (2016), Ryoma Terasaka
Gundam Build Fighters: Battlogue (2017), Allan Adams
The Heike Story (2021)
The Way of the Househusband (2021), Gōda
Super Crooks (2021), Sammy Diesel
Record of Ragnarok II (2023), Raiden Tameemon
Gamera: Rebirth (TBA), Brody

Theatrical animation
 Doraemon: Nobita's Dinosaur 2006 (2006), Takeshi Goda
 Furusato Japan (2007), Gonji Abe
 Doraemon: Nobita's New Great Adventure into the Underworld (2007), Takeshi Goda
 Doraemon: Nobita and the Green Giant Legend (2008), Takeshi Goda
 Doraemon: The Record of Nobita's Spaceblazer (2009), Takeshi Goda
 Doraemon: Nobita's Great Battle of the Mermaid King (2010), Takeshi Goda
 Doraemon: Nobita and the New Steel Troops—Winged Angels (2011), Takeshi Goda
 Doraemon: Nobita and the Island of Miracles—Animal Adventure (2012), Takeshi Goda
 Doraemon: Nobita's Secret Gadget Museum (2013), Takeshi Goda
 Doraemon: New Nobita's Great Demon—Peko and the Exploration Party of Five (2014), Takeshi Goda
 Stand by Me Doraemon (2014), Takeshi Goda
 Psycho-Pass: The Movie (2015), Sem
 Doraemon: Nobita's Space Heroes (2015), Takeshi Goda
 Doraemon: Nobita and the Birth of Japan 2016 (2016), Takeshi Goda
 Doraemon the Movie 2017: Great Adventure in the Antarctic Kachi Kochi (2017), Takeshi Goda
 Dance with Devils: Fortuna (2017), Mage Nanashiro
 Doraemon the Movie: Nobita's Treasure Island (2018), Takeshi Goda
 Doraemon: Nobita's Chronicle of the Moon Exploration (2019), Takeshi Goda
 Doraemon: Nobita's New Dinosaur (2020), Takeshi Goda
 Stand by Me Doraemon 2 (2020), Takeshi Goda
 The Crocodile That Lived for 100 Days (2021), Mole
 Doraemon: Nobita's Little Star Wars 2021 (2022), Takeshi Goda
 Re:cycle of Penguindrum (2022), Kanba Takakura
 That Time I Got Reincarnated as a Slime the Movie: Scarlet Bond (2022), Lacua
 The First Slam Dunk (2022), Hanamichi Sakuragi
 Kingdom of Gold, Kingdom of Water (2023), Jauhara

Video games
The World Ends with You (2007), Bito Daisukenojo
Kingdom Hearts 3D: Dream Drop Distance (2012), Bito Daisukenojo
Granblue Fantasy (2015), J.J., Takeshi Goda
IDOLiSH7 (2017), Inumaru Touma
Kingdom Hearts HD 2.8 Final Chapter Prologue (2017), Aced, Bito Daisukenojo
Shin Megami Tensei: Strange Journey Redux (2017), Zeus
WarioWare Gold (2018), 18-Volt, Mr. Sparkles
Kingdom Hearts III (2019), Aced
Zoids Wild: Blast Unleashed (2019), Gyoza
Fire Emblem: Three Houses (2019), Balthus
The King of Fighters for Girls (2019), Ryo Sakazaki
Disney Twisted-Wonderland (2020), Sam
Final Fantasy VII Remake (2020), Kotch
Soulcalibur VI (2020), Hwang Seong-gyeong
DC Super Hero Girls: Teen Power (2021), Hal Jordan
NEO: The World Ends With You (2021), Bito Daisukenojo
Tales of Luminaria (2021), Raoul
Shin Megami Tensei V (2021), Zeus
JoJo's Bizarre Adventure: All Star Battle R (2022), Pesci
Star Ocean: The Divine Force (2022), Raymond

Music/drama CD
Hypnosis Mic: Division Rap Battle (2017), Ichiro Yamada (MC B.B.)

Commercials
The Way of the Househusband (2020), Goda

Dubbing

Live-action
Taron Egerton
Testament of Youth, Edward Brittain
Kingsman: The Secret Service, Gary "Eggsy" Unwin
Kingsman: The Golden Circle, Gary "Eggsy" Unwin
Robin Hood, Robin Hood
Rocketman, Elton John
Winston Duke
Black Panther, M'Baku
Avengers: Infinity War, M'Baku
Avengers: Endgame, M'Baku
Black Panther: Wakanda Forever, M'Baku
The 100, Lincoln (Ricky Whittle)
Bad Boys for Life, Dorn (Alexander Ludwig)
Bad News Bears, Mike Engelberg
Bullet Train, The Wolf (Benito A. Martínez Ocasio)
CJ7, Storm Dragon
Cats, Plato and Socrates (Les Twins)
Cinderella, Town Crier (Doc Brown)
Dallas, Tommy Sutter (Callard Harris)
Danger Close: The Battle of Long Tan, Major Harry Smith (Travis Fimmel)
Dungeons & Dragons: Honor Among Thieves, Simon the Sorcerer (Justice Smith)
Empire, Jamal Lyon (Jussie Smollett)
Ender's Game, Dink Meeker (Khylin Rhambo)
F9, Twinkie (Bow Wow)
Fantastic Four, Reed Richards/Mr. Fantastic (Miles Teller)
Frankenstein's Army, Sergei (Joshua Sasse)
Fury, Lt. Parker (Xavier Samuel)
The Gallows, Ryan Shoos
Get Smart (2011 TV Asahi edition), Lloyd (Nate Torrence)
The Greatest Showman, Phillip Carlyle (Zac Efron)
The Handmaid's Tale, Commander Nick Blaine (Max Minghella)
Houdini & Doyle, George Gudgett (Adam Nagaitis)
In the Heights, Usnavi (Anthony Ramos)
Jexi, Kid Cudi
Mulan, Yao (Chen Tang)
Resident Evil: Welcome to Raccoon City, Chris Redfield (Robbie Amell)
Snake Eyes, Snake Eyes (Henry Golding)
Sonic the Hedgehog 2, Knuckles the Echidna (Idris Elba)
Spin Out, Billy (Xavier Samuel)
Superfly, Eddie (Jason Mitchell)
Tom & Jerry, Terrance (Michael Peña)
Top Gun: Maverick, Reuben "Payback" Fitch (Jay Ellis)

Animation
The Book of Life, Manolo Sánchez
Mao Mao: Heroes of Pure Heart, Badgerclops
Megamind, Hal Stewart/Tighten
Pac-Man and the Ghostly Adventures, Skeebo
Puss in Boots: The Last Wish, Baby Bear
RWBY, Cardin Winchester
Sing 2, Darius
Smallfoot, Migo
Soul, Paul
Star Wars Resistance, Kazuda Xiono
Trolls World Tour, Tiny Diamond

References

External links
 Official blog 
 Official agency profile 
 
 

1990 births
Living people
Actors from Saxony-Anhalt
Asia University (Japan) alumni
German emigrants to Japan
Japanese male child actors
Japanese male musical theatre actors
Japanese male models
Japanese rappers
Japanese television personalities
People from Blankenburg (Harz)
21st-century Japanese male actors
21st-century Japanese singers
21st-century Japanese male singers